George Peacock (25 July 1881 – 23 April 1943) was an Australian rules footballer who played with Melbourne in the Victorian Football League (VFL).

Notes

External links 

 

1881 births
1943 deaths
Australian rules footballers from Melbourne
Melbourne Football Club players
People from St Kilda, Victoria